Chance medley (from the Anglo-French chance-medlee, a mixed chance), also 'chaunce medley' or 'chaude melle', is a term from English law used to describe a homicide arising from a sudden quarrel or fight. In other words, the term describes "the casual killing of a man, not altogether without the killer's fault, though without an evil intent; homicide by misadventure". The term distinguishes a killing that lacks malice aforethought necessary for murder, on the one hand, and pure accident on the other.

An early version of voluntary manslaughter, "chance medley" was a common defense in the 16th and 17th centuries but had fallen out of use by the 18th century, gradually replaced by the doctrine of provocation.

References 

 

English criminal law
Manslaughter
English legal terminology